Ukwa is a census town in Madhya Pradesh.

Ukwa may also refer to:
 UKWA, a radio station in Perth, Australia
 Ukwa language, a language spoken in Nigeria
 Ukwa is a Nigerian breadfruit dish eaten by the Igbo people.
 The UK Web Archive